Brentwood Football Club was an English football club based in Brentwood, Essex, playing at the County Cricket Ground at Shenfield Road.  From 1886 the club was known as Crusaders F.C.

History

The club was founded in September 1877 under the name Brentwood F.C.  Within a fortnight of its founding the club had over 40 members.

The club played its first match on 6 October 1877, at Hendon, and opened its ground (provided by vice-president William Burgess), at the corner of Sawyer's Hall Lane and Shenfield Road, one week later, with a match between sides chosen by the club secretary and the club captain.  On 20 October 1877, the club had its first win, 6-0 at home to Romford.  

The club first entered the FA Cup in 1878-79, losing in the first round to the Pilgrims.  The club entered the competition for the next eight seasons under the Brentwood name, reaching the fourth round (last 16) in 1883-84, thanks to a bye in the second round.

In 1885-86, the club enjoyed its best-ever FA Cup run.  The club's last 16 tie, against Burslem Port Vale, proved controversial.  The Vale ground was a "perfect quagmire" and Brentwood protested the condition of the pitch before the match.  After the game, Brentwood added to their that "a point being given the Port Valeites which was never actually obtained, Mills‐Roberts [Brentwood goalkeeper] swearing that the ball passed wide of the uprights."  The Football Association upheld the protest and ordered a replay at a neutral venue (the County Ground in Derby), which ended 3-3.  The FA directed that the second replay be held at Brentwood, and Burslem Port Vale, having had an offer of £50 to switch the tie declined by Brentwood, withdrew from the competition.  

In the quarter-finals, the club lost at home to holders, and eventual winners, Blackburn Rovers, in front of a crowd of 3,000. 

From the 1886-87 season, the club changed its name to Crusaders F.C.  Under that name, the club's best run in the FA Cup was in 1887-88, reaching the fourth round after beating Lyndhurst 9-0 (the club's record Cup victory) in the first round, Old Wykehamists in the second, and Chatham in the third.  

In 1889, Crusaders faced Royal Arsenal in the FA Cup third qualifying round, in the latter's first-ever FA Cup season, with future powerhouses Arsenal winning 5–2 in extra time; the Crusaders appealed the referee's decision to extend the match on the basis of the "shocking" light, but it was not successful.  The club's last FA Cup tie came in 1892-93, losing in the second qualifying round to the Casuals.

The last competitive season for the club seems to have been in 1896-97, when it finished bottom of the South Essex League First Division, and withdrew rather than be relegated.

Colours

The club's colours were chocolate and magenta.

Capped players

Thelwell Pike, England, 1 cap, v Ireland, 1886

References

Association football clubs established in 1877
South Essex League
1877 establishments in England
Brentwood (Essex town)